The Whirling Dervish is an album by American jazz pianist Mal Waldron featuring performances recorded in Paris in 1972 and released by the French America label.

Reception
The Allmusic review by Jason Ankeny awarded the album 4 stars stating "The Whirling Dervish looms among Mal Waldron's boldest and most challenging sessions -- its three epic compositions are intimidating in their scope and reach, but the music rewards the intellectual commitment it demands with some of the pianist's most inspired playing".

Track listing
All compositions by Mal Waldron
 "Reaching Out" — 25:24 
 "The Whirling Dervish" — 11:03 
 "Walk" — 7:36 
Recorded in Paris, France in May 1972.

Personnel
 Mal Waldron — piano 
 Peter Warren — bass 
 Noel McGhie — drums

References

America Records albums
Mal Waldron albums
1972 albums